Melanoptilia arsenica is a moth of the family Pterophoridae. It is known from Bolivia, Brazil, Costa Rica and Peru.

The wingspan is 16–17 mm. Adults are on wing in March.

External links

Platyptiliini
Moths described in 1921
Taxa named by Edward Meyrick
Moths of South America